Paulo César da Costa Cunha (born 1 August 1980, Vila Nova de Gaia) is a former Portuguese basketball player.

References

External links
Paulo Cunha FIBA Archive
Paulo Cunha Eurobasket profile
Paulo Cunha Proballers profile
Paulo Cunha RealGM profile

1980 births
Living people
Portuguese men's basketball players
FC Porto basketball players
Power forwards (basketball)
Sportspeople from Vila Nova de Gaia